Al-Shajar is a Syrian village located in the Suqaylabiyah Subdistrict of the al-Suqaylabiyah District in Hama Governorate. According to the Syria Central Bureau of Statistics (CBS), al-Shajar had a population of 941 in the 2004 census.

References 

Populated places in al-Suqaylabiyah District